The Shirinyan-Babajanyan Alliance of Democrats, also known as the Alliance of Defenders of Democracy Party, is an Armenian political alliance between the For The Republic Party and the Christian-Democratic Rebirth Party.

History 
On 18 May 2021, the For The Republic Party and the Christian-Democratic Rebirth Party announced that they would participate in the 2021 Armenian parliamentary elections as a political alliance.

Arman Babajanyan was elected the leader of the alliance.

Following the election, the alliance did not enter the National Assembly, gaining just 1.50% of the popular vote, below the required 7% minimum needed for alliances.

Ideology 
The alliance opposed both Nikol Pashinyan and Robert Kocharyan from gaining power again. The alliance called for greater protection of Armenia's sovereignty and territorial integrity, while also supporting the rapid development of the economy. The alliance also criticized the CSTO military alliance for failing to assist Armenia following an Azerbaijani incursion onto Armenian territory.

Electoral record

See also

 Programs of political parties in Armenia

References 

Political parties established in 2021
Political party alliances in Armenia
Liberal parties in Armenia
2021 establishments in Armenia